The 2007–08 Boise State Broncos men's basketball team represented Boise State University in the 2007–08 college basketball season.  This was head coach Greg Graham's sixth season at Boise State. The Broncos competed in the Western Athletic Conference and played their home games at the Taco Bell Arena. Boise State finished the season 25–9, 12–4 in WAC play and won the 2008 WAC men's basketball tournament to receive the conference’s automatic bid to the NCAA tournament as No. 14 seed in the East region. The team was beaten by No. 3 seed Louisville in the opening round, 79–61.

Roster 

Sources

Schedule and results

|-
!colspan=9 style=| Regular season

|-
!colspan=9 style=| WAC Regular Season

|-
!colspan=9 style=| WAC Tournament

|-
!colspan=9 style=| 2008 NCAA tournament

Source

References

Boise State
Boise State Broncos men's basketball seasons
Boise State
Boise
Boise